Birjand University of Medical Sciences and Health Services (BUMS) is located in a province with a surface area of about 150,800 square kilometers which covers more than 9.1 percent of the lands of the Islamic Republic of Iran. This university has had a major role in the economic growth and development of the province. Under divine blessings, this university has now more than 3300 students in 53 fields of study in residency, doctorate of dentistry and general medicine, master's, bachelor's and associate levels, with 231 faculty members, enjoying modern advanced research and training facilities, including a rich library with more than 93000 printed books and 4500 digital files, which provide the accessibility to the newest international academic references for more than 6200 members, including university faculty members, students and staff. These have all turned the university into an active educational and medical center in eastern Iran.This university has very weak in education and research. Most of faculty members are dissatisfied.

Schools & faculties 
 School of Medicine
 School of Dentistry
 School of Nursing & Midwifery
 School of Allied Medicine
 School of Health

Research Centers & Groups 
 Cardiovascular Diseases Research Center 
 Cellular and Molecular Research Center
 Infectious Diseases Research Center
 Social Determinants of Health Research Center
 Medical Toxicology and Drug Abuse Research Center
 Health Technology Incubator Center 
 Asthma, Allergy and Immunology Research Center
 Research Centre of Experimental Medicine

See also

Higher Education in Iran
List of universities in Iran
List of hospitals in Iran

External links
Official website

Birjand
Medical schools in Iran
Universities in Iran
Educational institutions established in 1985
Education in South Khorasan Province
Buildings and structures in South Khorasan Province
1985 establishments in Iran